The Edmonton Cubs are a baseball team located in Edmonton, Alberta, Canada. They played in the Big Four League from 1947-1949.  The team won the league pennant in 1949.

The Cubs returned in 2013, and now compete in the Sunburst League Baseball Alberta under the Confederation Park banner. 

In 2019, they won their first Senior AAA provincial championship, winning the five game championship series 3-2 over the Sherwood Park Athletics. The Cubs would go on to win a second provincial championship in 2021, beating the Red Deer Riggers, also 3-2.

References

Cubs
Defunct minor league baseball teams
Defunct baseball teams in Canada
Baseball teams in Alberta